Sister cities of Toronto are cities with which Toronto is twinned geographically and politically, with the goal of fostering human contact and cultural interchange.

Relationships
The city maintains two types of relationships with other cities, partnership and friendship. Partnership cities are selected by city staff, with a focus toward economic development. Friendship cities activities are proposed by the community and endorsed by a member of Toronto City Council.

Partnership cities
  Chicago, Illinois, United States (1991)
  Chongqing, China (1986)
  Frankfurt, Germany (1989)
  Milan, Italy (2003)

Friendship cities
  Ho Chi Minh City, Vietnam (2006)
  Kyiv, Ukraine (1991)
  Quito, Ecuador (2006)
  Rio de Janeiro, Brazil (2015)
  Sagamihara, Japan (1991)
  Warsaw, Poland (1990)

Formation of relationships
Toronto's city council considers requests to form relationships with other cities through its International Alliance Program. The criteria for both Partnership Cities and Friendship Cities were adopted by council December 5–7, 2005. Forming a relationship is primarily dependent on budget constraints of the Economic Development Committee, the municipal office which administers the program.

Proposals for new relationships are requested by city staff, of their own volition or on behalf of a third party. These proposals are analyzed for political and financial impact, and a recommendation is then presented to the Economic Development Committee.

Principles for new relationships
In order to prevent spurious proposals, cities that are candidates for a relationship with Toronto must satisfy the following conditions:

 there can be no more than one relationship in any region
 the candidate city cannot have a relationship with another Canadian city
 community groups must raise funds to support exchanges with Friendship Cities to which they have committed
 the federal government must have a relationship with the country in which the candidate city is located

Proposals for new candidates are submitted to the General Manager of Economic Development; all proposals are analyzed and compiled into a yearly recommendation which coincides with the city's budget process.

Criteria for Friendship cities
To be considered for Friendship City status, a candidate city must fulfill the following criteria:

 it must be sponsored by a member of Toronto City Council
 it must be co-sponsored by an individual, group or association in the community that will assume responsibility for all activities with the Friendship city
 it must have support from the candidate city with respect to community interest and participation
 it must be a community of interest, with active support in Toronto and the Friendship city
 it must follow the international policy framework approved by Council in May 2002

Candidate analysis
Once a proposal is presented to the General Manager of Economic Development, it is reviewed by staff to determine the candidate's status and applicability for formation of a relationship with Toronto. Whereas the criteria identified are minimal requirements, the review process is a more thorough investigation of the candidate city.

Recommendations to accept a proposal are often made only for cities which have strong similarities to, or compatibility with, Toronto. It must exhibit a diverse economic structure, instead of being dependent on one factor only, such as tourism. It should have sizeable population in the city core, and be the centre of an urban agglomeration.

Proposals for 2006
On June 14, 2006, a report analyzing the candidacy of four cities was presented to, and considered by city council. Four cities were discussed:

 Lisbon was deemed to meet most of the criteria for a relationship, but was ultimately rejected because of Toronto's numerous relationships in the region, citing that "adding one more European city to an already unbalanced international portfolio is not recommended". The report noted that Lisbon and Toronto have very strong community and business relationships, as well as Toronto having a significant Portuguese population.
 Manila was rejected because it already has a relationship with another Canadian city, and also because Toronto has a relationship with a city in that region
 Monte Carlo was rejected because it does not have a diverse economy, being dependent on tourism, and because it does not match demographically with Toronto
 Montego Bay was rejected for lack of compatibility both demographically and economically with Toronto; the report noted the strong presence of Jamaican culture in Toronto, and its lack of relationship with cities from the Caribbean

Former partnerships
 Amsterdam, Netherlands
 Wuxi, China
 New York City, New York, United States
 Indianapolis, Indiana, United States
 São Paulo, Brazil

References

Sister cities
Toronto
Sister cities